Deramas ikedai is a butterfly of the family Lycaenidae, found on Mindanao in the Philippines. The species was first described by Hisakazu Hayashi in 1978.

References

 , 1978: Lycaenid butterflies from Mindanao, with the descriptions of new genus, new species and new subspecies (Lepidoptera: Lycaenidae). Tyô to Ga. 29 (3): 164-168.
, 1995. Checklist of the butterflies of the Philippine Islands (Lepidoptera: Rhopalocera) Nachrichten des Entomologischen Vereins Apollo Suppl. 14: 7-118.

 , 2012: Revised checklist of the butterflies of the Philippine Islands (Lepidoptera: Rhopalocera). Nachrichten des Entomologischen Vereins Apollo, Suppl. 20: 1-64.

Butterflies described in 1978
Deramas